John Stephenson (29 December 1881 – 22 September 1940) was a former Australian rules footballer who played with Carlton in the Victorian Football League (VFL).

Notes

External links 		
		
John Stephenson's profile at Blueseum		
		
		
		
		
1881 births		
1940 deaths		
Australian rules footballers from Victoria (Australia)		
Carlton Football Club players